"All Y'all" is a song by the American recording duo Timbaland & Magoo. It has accompanying vocals by the R&B singer Tweet and Timbaland's brother Sebastian. The song was the second single released from Timbaland & Magoo's second album, Indecent Proposal (2001).

Music video
A music video for the single was directed by Nick Quested and was released in the week of December 10, 2001. The video follows the song's lyrical concept in a continuous shot, where Timbaland, Magoo, Sebastian and Tweet take turns performing in differing settings while following the camera.

Track listings and formats
European 12" vinyl
 "All Y'all" (Clean Edit) (featuring Tweet) — 3:57
 "Drop" (featuring Fatman Scoop) — 6:05
 "All Y'all" (Instrumental) — 3:57

US 12" vinyl
 "All Y'all" (Album Version) (featuring Tweet) — 3:57
 "All Y'all" (Radio Edit) (featuring Tweet) — 3:57 
 "All Y'all" (Instrumental) (featuring Tweet) — 3:57
 "All Y'all" (Acapella) (featuring Tweet) — 3:57

US CD single
 "All Y'all" (Album Version) (fedaturing Tweet) — 4:02 
 "All Y'all" (Radio Edit) (featuring Tweet) — 4:02
 "All Y'all" (Instrumental) — 3:58
 "All Y'all" (Acapella) (featuring Tweet) — 4:01
 "All Y'all" (Call Out Hook) — 0:11

Charts
The song debuted on the Billboard' Hot R&B/Hip-Hop Singles & Tracks chart at number 77 in the week of November 10, 2001. It peaked at 58 less than three weeks later.

See also
Timbaland production discography

References 

2001 singles
2001 songs
Tweet (singer) songs
Blackground Records singles
Atlantic Records singles
Virgin Records singles
Song recordings produced by Timbaland
Songs written by Timbaland
Songs written by Tweet (singer)